George "Tolley" Wienand (7 April 1910 – 1 December 1993) was a professional footballer, who played for Huddersfield Town and Hull City. He was born in East London, Eastern Cape, South Africa. He also played in eighteen first-class cricket matches from 1934/35 to 1953/54.

References

External links
99 Years & Counting - Stats & Stories - Huddersfield Town History
Cricinfo

1910 births
1993 deaths
Sportspeople from East London, Eastern Cape
South African soccer players
Association football midfielders
English Football League players
Huddersfield Town A.F.C. players
Hull City A.F.C. players
South African cricketers
Border cricketers
Gauteng cricketers
Soccer players from the Eastern Cape